G.S. Lavrio B.C. (Greek: Γ.Σ. Λαυρίου K.A.E.), commonly known as simply Lavrio B.C., and also known for sponsorship reasons as Lavrio Megabolt and Lavrio Aegean Cargo, is a Greek professional basketball club that is based in Lavrio, Attica, Greece. The club's full name is Gymnastikos Syllogos Lavrio Basketball Club. The club's current logo is an owl, which symbolizes the ancient Athenian coins, which were made of metals from Lavrio's mines. The team currently plays in the Greek Basket League, the top-tier level basketball league in Greece, and also recently competed in the secondary level European-wide league, the FIBA Champions League.

History
In 1990, Lavrio was established. From 1990 to 2002, the club competed in the neighborhood regional ESKA leagues. The club then spent five years playing at the Greek C National League level, from 2002 until 2007, when the club was promoted to the Greek B National League. During the club's first two seasons in the Greek National B League, 2007–08 and 2008–09, Lavrio ranked 6th in the final league standings. But the next season, 2009–10, it was declared the champion team of the category, after winning a tie-breaker with Panelefsiniakos (24 wins and 6 losses ). Therefore, for the first time in the club's history, it came up to the Greek A2 National League. At the same time, in the Greek Cup competition, the club was eliminated after four games, losing in the 2nd leg of the second phase of the tournament, against PAOK, by a score of 73–83.

During its first season in the Greek A2 Basket League, in 2010–11, Lavrio finished in 4th place in the league standings. In the Greek Cup tournament, the club was eliminated on the 2nd game day, where they were defeated by a score of 69–63, against Nea Kifissia. In the following season, 2011–12, while still competing in the Greek A2 League category, they finished in 8th place in the league standings. In the course of the Greek Cup, they were eliminated on the 2nd game day of Phase A, after being defeated by a score of 74–59, against Panerythraikos. In the 2012–13 season, the team continued its good performances, and finished in 5th place in the final standings of the league classification tables. In the Greek Cup, they were eliminated at the first game of the second phase, when they were defeated by Ikaroi Serron, by a score of 64–60.

In the 2014–15 Greek A2 Basket League season, Lavrio finished in third place in the league. Because the club KAOD withdrew from the top-tier level Greek Basket League, Lavrio was then promoted up to the top professional national basketball league in Greece, for the first time in its history. Lavrio managed to secure their place in the league for the next season, one game before the end of the season, even though the team lost that game to Aries Trikala. The club finished the 2015–16 Greek League season in 11th place.

The club played in a European-wide competition for the first time in the 2018–19 season, as it competed in the first qualifying round of Europe's fourth-tier level competition, the FIBA Europe Cup. On September 20, 2018, Lavrio played its first European game, which resulted in an 82–73 victory over the Ukrainian SuperLeague club Dnipro. Lavrio made it to the finals of the 2020–21 Greek Basket League season, and thus qualified to play in the European-wide secondary competition, the FIBA Champions League, in the 2021–22 season.

Arenas
Lavrio plays its domestic national home league games at the Lavrio Indoor Hall, which is located in Lavrio, Attica. The arena has a seating capacity of 1,700 people for basketball games. Lavrio plays its European-wide home league games at the Peace and Friendship Stadium, which is located in the Neo Faliro district of, Piraeus, Athens. The arena has a seating capacity of 12,000 people for basketball games.

Sponsorship names
Due to sponsorship reasons, the club has known several names:
Lavrio DHI: (2016–2017)
Lavrio Megabolt: (2017–2018), (2019–present)
Lavrio Aegean Cargo: (2018–2019)

Titles and honors

Domestic competitions
Greek League Finalist: (2021)
Greek 3rd Division Champion: (2010)
Greek 4th Division First Group Champion: (2007)

Season by season

Logos

Players

Current roster

Depth chart

Notable players

  Sakis Giannakopoulos
  Michalis Perrakis
  Giannis Kouzeloglou
  Dimitris Kaklamanakis
  Vassilis Mouratos
  Nikos Barlos
  Christoforos Stefanidis
  Vangelis Sakellariou
  Vassilis Charalampopoulos
  Michalis Lountzis
  Alexandros Nikolaidis
  Milan Milošević
  Gilvydas Biruta
  Jito Kok
  Al-Wajid Aminu
  O. D. Anosike
  Malik Dime
  Marko Kešelj
  Ashley Hamilton
  Kyle Allman Jr.
  Shizz Alston
  Demarius Bolds
  Tyson Carter
  Glenn Cosey
  Devin Davis
  Alpha Diallo
  Quenton DeCosey
  Sean Evans
  D. J. Johnson
  Ousman Krubally
  Doron Lamb
  McKenzie Moore
  Zamal Nixon
  Kevin Punter
  Jared Savage
  Jerry Smith
  Rashad Vaughn
  Glynn Watson Jr.
  Antwaine Wiggins
  Jeff Withey
  Brandon Young

Head coaches
  Christos Serelis: (2005–2022, 2022–2023)

References

External links
Official website 
Eurobasket.com Team Profile
FIBA Basketball Champions League Team Profile
FIBA Europe Cup Team Profile
Greek Basket League Profile 
Greek Basket League Profile 

Lavrio B.C.
Basketball teams established in 1990
Basketball teams in Greece